Coleosoma is a genus of comb-footed spiders that was first described by Octavius Pickard-Cambridge in 1882.

Species
 it contains ten species, found all over the world:
Coleosoma acutiventer (Keyserling, 1884) – USA to Argentina
Coleosoma africanum Schmidt & Krause, 1995 – Cape Verde Is.
Coleosoma blandum O. Pickard-Cambridge, 1882 (type) – Seychelles, India, Bangladesh, Myanmar, Thailand, Philippines, China, Japan
Coleosoma caliothripsum Barrion & Litsinger, 1995 – Philippines
Coleosoma floridanum Banks, 1900 – North, Central and South America. Introduced to Europe, Macaronesia, West Africa, Seychelles, India, Pacific Is.
Coleosoma matinikum Barrion & Litsinger, 1995 – Philippines
Coleosoma normale Bryant, 1944 – USA to Brazil
Coleosoma octomaculatum (Bösenberg & Strand, 1906) – China, Korea, Taiwan, Japan. Introduced to New Zealand
Coleosoma pabilogum Barrion & Litsinger, 1995 – Philippines
Coleosoma pseudoblandum Barrion & Litsinger, 1995 – Philippines

Formerly included:
C. adamsoni (Berland, 1934) (Transferred to Platnickina)
C. margaritum Yoshida, 1985 (Transferred to Neottiura)

In synonymy:
C. acrobeles  = Coleosoma blandum O. Pickard-Cambridge, 1882
C. albovittatum  = Coleosoma floridanum Banks, 1900
C. aleipata  = Coleosoma floridanum Banks, 1900
C. antheae  = Coleosoma floridanum Banks, 1900
C. conurum  = Coleosoma blandum O. Pickard-Cambridge, 1882
C. delebile  = Coleosoma floridanum Banks, 1900
C. flavipes O. Pickard-Cambridge, 1895 = Coleosoma acutiventer (Keyserling, 1884)
C. floridanum  = Coleosoma acutiventer (Keyserling, 1884)
C. interruptum  = Coleosoma floridanum Banks, 1900
C. nigripalpe  = Coleosoma acutiventer (Keyserling, 1884)
C. rapanae  = Coleosoma floridanum Banks, 1900
C. saispotum Barrion & Litsinger, 1995 = Coleosoma floridanum Banks, 1900
C. semicinctum (Banks, 1914) = Coleosoma floridanum Banks, 1900
C. vituperabile  = Coleosoma blandum O. Pickard-Cambridge, 1882

See also
 List of Theridiidae species

References

Araneomorphae genera
Cosmopolitan spiders
Taxa named by Octavius Pickard-Cambridge
Theridiidae